Bogut is a South Slavic surname and may refer to:

Andrew Bogut (born 1984), Australian professional basketball player of Croatian origin
Željko Bogut (born 1969), Bosnian chess player
Vojvoda Bogut, 14th-century Serbian nobleman, an ancestor of the House of Petrović-Njegoš

See also
Bogutovac, a village in the municipality of Kraljevo, Serbia